Tom Whitney (born May 16, 1989) is an American professional golfer.

Amateur career
Whitney was born in South Lake Tahoe, California and lives in Little Elm, Texas. He attended La Quinta High School in La Quinta, California. After high school, he attended the United States Air Force Academy. Whitney won four collegiate tournaments and set four low-scoring school records in his college career. Whitney also competed in the 2009 U.S. Amateur Public Links and the 2009 U.S. Amateur. Whitney completed his college career as a two-time GCAA All-America Scholar  and a finalist for the Byron Nelson Award.

Military service
Whitney is a 2010 graduate of the United States Air Force Academy where he earned a Bachelor of Science Degree in Social Sciences.  
After his graduation from the academy he was commissioned as a Second Lieutenant in the United States Air Force in 2010 and rose to the rank of First Lieutenant while assigned to the 319th Missile Squadron at F.E. Warren Air Force Base in Wyoming. As an Air Force officer he served as a nuclear missile operator. After a four-year term of active duty in the Air Force, he left in May 2014 to pursue a career in professional golf.

Military wins
Whitney won the Air Force Golf Championship four times, the Armed Forces Golf Championship three times and was the 2012 winner of the CISM World Military Golf Championship, making him one of the most successful golfers in the United States Air Force.

Professional career
Having turned professional after graduating from the US Air Force Academy, Whitney's first tournament was by means of a sponsor exemption at the 2010 Colorado Open. He made the cut and finished T32. In 2015 he made his first start on the Web.com Tour at the Utah Championship, where he made the cut and finished T63 having made the field via Monday qualifying. In 2016 he qualified for the PGA Tour Latinoamérica having missed out at the Web.com Tour qualifying school; he finished 11th on the money list to graduate to the Web.com Tour for 2017.

In 2017, Whitney gained his first start on the PGA Tour by winning the Monday qualifier for the Shriners Hospitals for Children Open. He finished the season ranked 89th on the Web.com Tour money list.

In 2018, having received a sponsor exemption into the PGA Tour's CareerBuilder Challenge, he made his first cut at the highest level and went on to finish T67. In 2019, Whitney won the Abierto OSDE del Centro on the PGA Tour Latinoamérica; he finished the season in second place on the tours Order of Merit to regain his place on the Korn Ferry Tour for the following season.

Whitney has also won ten tournaments on various mini-tours.

Professional wins (11)

PGA Tour Latinoamérica wins (1)

Other wins (10)
2011 Pepsi Tour Event at Cimarron Golf Resort
2014 Avondale Open (eGolf/Gateway Tour), Oregon Trail Pro-Am Tournament
2015 Waterloo Open Golf Classic, Western North Dakota Charity Pro-Am, Nevada Open, All-American Gateway Tour zTrip Classic
2016 Swing Thought Tour 54 @ Sun ‘N Lake Golf Club, Waterloo Open Golf Classic
2017 Sand Hollow Open

Professional records
Low first-round record at the Colorado Open with an opening round 64 on July 26, 2012 
Course record 64 at Jacksonville Naval Air Station (Red & White Course) on October 8, 2012

Team appearances
Aruba Cup (representing PGA Tour Latinoamérica): 2016 (winners)

See also
List of United States Air Force Academy alumni

External links

References

American male golfers
Golfers from California
Golfers from Colorado
Golfers from Texas
People from La Quinta, California
Sportspeople from Fort Collins, Colorado
People from Little Elm, Texas
1989 births
Living people